Udala (Sl. No.: 31) is a Vidhan Sabha constituency of Mayurbhanj district, Odisha.

Area of this constituency includes Udala, Udala block, Gopabandhu Nagar block and 19 GPs (Badabisol, Badagudgudia, Badkhaladi, Chakradharpur, Devala, Jadida, Jambani, Jayantipatta, Samil, Jamudiha, Jhinkpada, Kaptipada, Koliolam, Majhigadia, Manakadpada, Nuddiha, Pedagadi, Pingu and Salchua) of Kaptipada block.

In 2009 election,  Biju Janata Dal candidate Shrinath Soren defeated Indian National Congress candidate Anang Charan Senapati by a margin of 11,193 votes.

Elected members

15 elections held during 1957  to 2022. Elected members from the Udala constituency are:

2019: (10) Bhaskar Madhei (BJP)
2014: (31): Golak Bihari Nayak (BJD)
2009: (31): Shrinath Soren (BJD)
2004: (10): Bhaskar Madhei (BJP) 
2000: (10): Bhaskar Madhei (BJP)
1995: (10): Rabaneswar Madhei (Congress)
1990: (10): Rohidas Soren (Janata Dal)
1985: (10): Rabaneswar Madhei (Congress-I)
1980: (10): Rabaneswar Madhei (Congress-I)
1977: (10): Birabhadra Singh (Janata Party)
1974: (10): Rabaneswar Madhei (Congress)
1971: (10): Manamohan Tudu (Congress)
1967: (10): Manamohan Tudu (Orissa Jana Congress)
1961: (133): Manamohan Tudu (Congress)
1957: (95): Manamohan Tudu (Congress)

Election results

2019

2014

2009

Notes

References

Assembly constituencies of Odisha
Politics of Mayurbhanj district